Red Banks is an unincorporated community located in the town of Scott, Brown County, Wisconsin, United States.

History

In 1634, Jean Nicolet landed at Red Banks becoming the first European to explore the present state of Wisconsin.

Notes

Unincorporated communities in Brown County, Wisconsin
Unincorporated communities in Wisconsin